The canton of Clamecy is an administrative division of the Nièvre department, central France. Its borders were modified at the French canton reorganisation which came into effect in March 2015. Its seat is in Clamecy.

It consists of the following communes:
 
Amazy
Armes
Asnois
Billy-sur-Oisy
Breugnon
Brèves
La Chapelle-Saint-André
Chevroches
Clamecy
Corvol-l'Orgueilleux
Courcelles
Cuncy-lès-Varzy
Dirol
Dornecy
Entrains-sur-Nohain
Flez-Cuzy
Lys
La Maison-Dieu
Marcy
Menou
Metz-le-Comte
Moissy-Moulinot
Monceaux-le-Comte
Neuffontaines
Nuars
Oisy
Ouagne
Oudan
Parigny-la-Rose
Pousseaux
Rix
Ruages
Saint-Aubin-des-Chaumes
Saint-Didier
Saint-Germain-des-Bois
Saint-Pierre-du-Mont
Saizy
Surgy
Talon
Tannay
Teigny
Trucy-l'Orgueilleux
Varzy
Vignol
Villiers-le-Sec
Villiers-sur-Yonne

References

Cantons of Nièvre